The men's team was a golf event held as part of the Golf at the 1904 Summer Olympics programme. It was the last time a golf event was held at the Olympics until 2016. Three teams of 10 golfers competed. The competition was held on September 17, 1904.

Rosters
Originally only two teams showed up for this event. However, a number of other players were available and formed a team at the last minute. As they were all members of the U.S.G.A. member golf club, they competed under the title of that organization. Kenneth Edwards and John Maxwell did not compete in the subsequent individual event.

 Western Golf Association
Edward CumminsKenneth EdwardsChandler EganWalter EganRobert HunterNathaniel MooreMason PhelpsDaniel SawyerClement SmootWarren Wood

 Trans-Mississippi Golf Association
John CadyAlbert Bond LambertJohn MaxwellBurt McKinnieRalph McKittrickFrancis NewtonHenry PotterFrederick SempleStuart StickneyWilliam Stickney

United States Golf Association
Douglass CadwalladerJesse CarletonHarold FraserArthur HusseyOrus JonesAllan LardGeorge OliverSimeon PriceJohn RahmHarold Weber

Results

Individual results
The individual results for the 10 golfers on each team were summed to determine the team standings.

Team scores

Sources

Golf at the 1904 Summer Olympics